Podbablje is a municipality in Croatia in the Split-Dalmatia County. It has a population of 4,904 (2001 census), 93.6% which are Croats.

Populated places in Split-Dalmatia County
Municipalities of Croatia